7 billion Others is a series of videos by Yann Arthus-Bertrand. Each of the videos feature a single person telling the viewer about their life, often in their native language. The project's homepage states that since the project's beginning in 2003, over 5000 individuals have had their testimonials recorded for the project. According to Arthus-Bertrand, the project's aim is to help different people to understand each other through listening.
The project was previously called 6 billion Others, but is meanwhile renamed to 7 billion others.

References

External links

2003 films
Films directed by Yann Arthus-Bertrand
Oral history
Video art